Balloon tamponade usually refers to the use of balloons inserted into the esophagus, stomach or uterus, and inflated to alleviate or stop refractory bleeding.

Esophagus or stomach
When inserted into the esophagus or stomach, balloon catheters are intended to stop bleeding such as from vascular structures—including esophageal varices and gastric varices—in the upper gastrointestinal tract.

There are many different types of balloons manufactured for the purpose of tamponading upper gastrointestinal bleeds, each with different volume capacities and aspiration ports tailored for the specific application.

Examples include:
 Sengstaken-Blakemore tube, with three lumens (two balloons and a gastric aspiration port). Pressure can be applied to gastric and esophageal varices by balloon inflation and traction.
 Linton tube, with a large gastric balloon, and gastric and esophageal aspirates
 Minnesota four-lumen tube, with esophageal and gastric balloons, and esophageal and gastric aspirates.

Balloon tamponade is considered a bridge to more definitive treatment modalities, and is usually administered in the Emergency Department or in the intensive-care unit setting, due to the illness of patients and the complications of the procedure.

Uterus
In the uterus, balloon tamponade can alleviate or stop postpartum hemorrhage. Inflating a Sengstaken–Blakemore tube in the uterus successfully treats atonic postpartum hemorrhage refractory to medical management in approximately 80% of cases. Such procedure is relatively simple, inexpensive and has low surgical morbidity. A Bakri balloon is a balloon tamponade specifically constructed for uterine postpartum hemorrhage.

Bakri Balloon Tamponade (BBT), designed for postpartum hemorrhage, is an effective life-saving balloon.

A recent study involving 50 cases was carried out by the department of Obstetrics and Gynecology at University Central Hospital in Helsinki, Finland.  With an overall success rate of 86%, the authors concluded that the Bakri Balloon Tamponade (BBT) is “a simple, readily available, effective and safe procedure” in the management of postpartum hemorrhage (PPH). The research also indicates that BBT is able to provide practitioners with  “time for other interventions or transportation from local hospital to tertiary centre”. The authors of the study recommend BBT be included in the PPH protocol.

Tamponade balloon, "Bakri Postpartum Balloon" was reported by several global studies and reviews to be very effective in postpartum hemorrhage (PPH). It is specifically designed for controlling "Obstetric Hemorrhage". Several peer-review medical journals publications support its use. You can use new model of "Bakri Postpartum Balloon with Rapid Instillation Components" allowing easy installation of the catheter.

An alternative to the Bakri is the BT-Cath (Balloon-Tamponade Catheter) which has an easy-fill system allowing single person inflation and saving time in the theatre setting. The shape of the BT-Cath is more pear shaped and contours to the uterus more easily than the Bakri.

A low cost alternative is a condom balloon tamponade, a form of intrauterine tamponade, created from a catheter, a male latex condom, and a string to tie the condom to the catheter. The method was developed in Bangladesh in 2001 by Dr. Sayeba Akhter and has since been supported by health workers worldwide as an effective method to stop post partum hemorrhage, particularly in low resource settings.

See also 
 Resuscitative endovascular balloon occlusion of the aorta

References

Digestive system procedures
Obstetrics